Lovely may refer to:

Film and television 
 Lovely (1979 film), an Indian Malayalam film
 Lovely (2001 film), an Indian Tamil film
 Lovely (2012 film), an Indian Telugu film
 "Lovely" (Desperate Housewives), an episode of Desperate Housewives

Music 
 Lovely Music, an American record label
 Stefy, an American pop band formerly known as The Lovely
 Lovelytheband, an American indie pop band

Albums 
 Lovely (Jocelyn Enriquez album), 1994
 Lovely (The Primitives album), 1988
 Lovely, a 1997 album by Honey
 Lovely, a 1998 EP by Luke Vibert

Songs 
 "Lovely" (Billie Eilish and Khalid song), 2018
 "Lovely" (Twenty One Pilots song), 2011
 "Lovely (Yumemiru Lovely Boy)", by Tommy February6, 2004
 "Lovely", by Bubba Sparxxx from Dark Days, Bright Nights
 "Lovely", by Chris Tomlin from And If Our God Is for Us...
 "Lovely", by Kanika Kapoor, Ravindra Upadhyay, Miraya Varma, and Fateh from the film Happy New Year
 "Lovely", by Lil Wayne from 500 Degreez
 "Lovely", by Shawn McDonald from Ripen
 "Lovely", by Suicidal Tendencies from Lights...Camera...Revolution!
 "Lovely", written by Stephen Sondheim for the musical A Funny Thing Happened on the Way to the Forum

Places 
 Lovely, Kentucky, an unincorporated community in the United States
 Lovely County, Arkansas Territory, a county from 1827 to 1828
 Lovely Valley, South Australia, now covered by the Myponga Reservoir

People 
 Lovely (surname)
 Lovely Anand, Indian politician and convicted murderer
 Lovely Warren (born 1977), mayor of Rochester, New York

Other uses 
 Kingdom of Lovely, an Internet-based community resulting from the UK television comedy series How to Start Your Own Country
 Lovely Professional University, Jalandhar, Punjab, India
 Lovely (perfume), a fragrance by Sarah Jessica Parker

See also
 Loveli (born 1989), Japanese model and television personality
 Luvli, American singer
 Luvli, a virtual pet at the website Moshi Monsters
 Telînaz (English: Lovely), an album by Zakaria Abdulla
 
 Loverly, a 2008 album by Cassandra Wilson